Barura is an Upazila of Comilla District in the Division of Chittagong, Bangladesh.

History 
Barura Thana was formed in 1948 and turned into an Upazila in 1983. In 1995 Barura Upazila was turned into a municipality.

Demographics
It has 52,852 households and a total area of 241.65 sq km. According to the 1991 Bangladesh census, Barura had a population of 310,778.

Administration 
Barura Upazila is divided into Barura Municipality and 15 Union Parishads: Aganagar, Bhabanipur, Uttar Khoshbas, Dakshin Khoshbas, Chitodda, Jhalam, Uttar Shilmuri, Dakshin Shilmuri, Adda, Adra, Shakpur, Galimpur, Vauksar, Laxmipur and Payalgacha. The union parishads are subdivided into 212 mauzas and 314 villages.

Barura Municipality is subdivided into 9 wards and 26 mahallas.

Upazila Administration is run by the Office of the Upazila Nirbahi Officer. Upazila Nirbahi Officer (UNO) is the Chief Executive Officer of the Upazila and She is an Upazila Magistrate. The Name of Present Upazila Nirbahi Officer (UNO) is Sabrina Afrin Mostafa.  AC (Land) is another officer of Administration Cadre who is accountable and responsible for land management.

Representative 
Nasimul Alam Chowdhury was elected to parliament for Comilla-8 as an Awami League candidate in 2018.

Gallery

Notable residents
 AKM Nazir Ahmed, politician, was born in Boalia village .

See also
Upazilas of Bangladesh
Districts of Bangladesh
Divisions of Bangladesh

References 

 
Upazilas of Comilla District